The RAM P99 is a paintball marker manufactured by Chinese company Qian Wei and distributed in the United States by Umarex USA under the "Real Action Markers" brand. It is distributed in Europe by Umarex, Germany. The RAM P99 is made under license and designed to replicate the Walther P99.

Operation

Powered by a 12g disposable CO2 cartridge or re-fillable internal air system, it features a blowback design and 9 shot capacity magazine using .43 caliber paintballs or rubberballs. The trigger is double-action (DA/SA). First versions did not have a conventional on/off safety. Current versions now have a manual trigger-lock safety. The marker is cocked by working the slide and there is also a functional de-cocker. It differs from the RAP4/5 system as it does not use (and therefore) eject shell casings. Muzzle velocity is adjustable between 200 ft/s and 300 ft/s. For  .43 cal paintball - 0.029 oz it is about 3.4371 J (at 300 ft/s).

Use

The RAM P99 looks, feels and shoots with great accuracy just like the Walther P99 firearm making it ideal for law enforcement and military training, especially close quarter battles and room clearings. The RAM P99 is also used for virtual reality paintball play.

Accessories/options

It has the original markings and insignia and is available in 4 versions: black, green, silver, blue.

Most of the accessories available for the Walther P99 are compatible with the RAM P99 including:
Tactical flashlight systems
Under-barrel rail laser sights
Holsters
Carry cases

Images

Paintball markers